Mai Fat (translated as 'black mangrove wood') is a tambon (sub-district) of Sikao District, Trang Province in southern Thailand.

Description
Mai Fat was established in 1894. Mai Fat is the location of many marine attractions of Trang, such as Pak Meng Beach, Chang Lang Beach, Hat Chao Mai National Park. The Rajamangala Aquarium is at the Faculty of Science and Fisheries Technology, Rajamangala University of Technology Srivijaya, Trang Campus.

Geography
The terrain is characterized by sandy soils, flat hills and the Andaman seacoast. Neighboring sub-districts are (from the north clockwise): Bo Hin, Na Mueang Phet, and Bang Sak. It occupies the southernmost area of the district. It is about 29 km (18 mi) from the Mueang Trang District by road.

Administration

Central administration
The sub-district is divided into seven administrative villages:

Local administration
The sub-district is administered by the subdistrict administrative organization (SAO) Mai Fat (องค์การบริหารส่วนตำบลไม้ฝาด)

References

Tambon of Trang Province